Burnupena papyracea, common name the papery burnupena, is a species of sea snail, a marine gastropod mollusk in the family Buccinidae, the true whelks.

Description
The length of the shell attains 60 mm,

The oblong, conical shell is rather thin. It is of a reddish-brown color, covered transversely with striae and ridges, with some slightly apparent longitudinal striae. The transverse ridges are raised and very prominent. The spire is elongated and contains seven whorls. These are convex and depressed at their upper part.  The body whorl is longer than all the others together. The aperture is elongated, ovate, of a reddish yellow, and slightly emarginated at its base. The outer lip is thin, forming at its upper and internal part a sort of small canal at its union with the left lip. The columella is almost straight, subverrucose, and of a reddish yellow.

The shell is dull brown with fine ridges along the spirals and a papery outer layer that peels off when dead, but in life is usually encrusted by the commensal bryozoan Alcyonidium nodosum which gives a slightly nodular velvety appearance in purplish to orangy browns Easily confused in the field with B. pubescens, which does not reach the same maximum size.

Distribution

This marine species occurs off the west coast of South Africa from Namibia to Hermanus, subtidally to 37m, Endemic.

References

 Steyn, D.G. & Lussi, M. (1998) Marine Shells of South Africa. An Illustrated Collector’s Guide to Beached Shells. Ekogilde Publishers, Hartebeespoort, South Africa, ii + 264 pp. page(s): 110
  Branch, G.M. et al. (2002). Two Oceans. 5th impression. David Philip, Cate Town & Johannesburg
 Kilburn R.N., Marais J.P. & Fraussen K. (2010) Buccinidae. pp. 16–52, in: Marais A.P. & Seccombe A.D. (eds), Identification guide to the seashells of South Africa. Volume 1. Groenkloof: Centre for Molluscan Studies. 376 pp.

External links

Buccinidae
Gastropods described in 1789